Trigonoscuta cruzi is a species of broad-nosed weevil in the beetle family Curculionidae. It is found in North America.

Subspecies
These six subspecies belong to the species Trigonoscuta cruzi:
 Trigonoscuta cruzi cruzi g
 Trigonoscuta cruzi marinae Pierce, 1975 c g
 Trigonoscuta cruzi minor Pierce, 1975 c g
 Trigonoscuta cruzi mossi Pierce, 1975 c g
 Trigonoscuta cruzi ordi Pierce, 1975 c g
 Trigonoscuta cruzi vonbloekeri Pierce, 1975 c g
Data sources: i = ITIS, c = Catalogue of Life, g = GBIF, b = Bugguide.net

References

Further reading

 
 

Entiminae
Articles created by Qbugbot
Beetles described in 1975